Nuno Miguel Torres Piloto de Albuquerque (born 19 March 1982), known as Piloto, is a Portuguese footballer who plays as a central midfielder.

Club career
Born in Tondela, Viseu District, Piloto was brought up in the youth system of Académica de Coimbra. His first season as a senior would be spent with semi-professional Anadia FC, in 2001–02, after which he played two years with Académica's reserves in the third division; his debut with the first team arrived late into 2002–03.

Piloto was used irregularly in his first years with the main squad (six Primeira Liga appearances, then 25 and nine), definitely becoming an important part in 2007–08 and scoring his first league goals in the following campaign in home matches against C.D. Nacional (1–1) and C.F. Os Belenenses (1–0). By this time, he was already team captain.

In June 2009, after rejecting offers for a new deal, Piloto moved abroad and signed a three-year contract with Iraklis Thessaloniki F.C. in Greece. In the end of July, during pre-season training, he suffered a tear in the ligaments of his left knee after a strong challenge by Matías Lequi, being sidelined for six months. The surgery took place in his country, on 10 August, being performed by FC Porto's medical staff.

After failing to make a single appearance, Piloto returned to Portugal and signed a two-year deal with top flight club S.C. Olhanense. On 6 September 2013, after three years with little playing time, narrowly avoiding relegation in his last, he rejoined Académica.

On 23 June 2016, in spite of his team's relegation to the Segunda Liga, 34-year-old Piloto renewed his contract – about to expire – for another year.

Academic career
Still as a professional footballer, Piloto graduated from the University of Coimbra with a degree in biochemistry, majoring in 2005. This was followed by a master's degree in 2009.

References

External links

1982 births
Living people
Portuguese footballers
Association football midfielders
Primeira Liga players
Liga Portugal 2 players
Segunda Divisão players
Associação Académica de Coimbra – O.A.F. players
Anadia F.C. players
G.D. Tourizense players
S.C. Olhanense players
Iraklis Thessaloniki F.C. players
Portuguese expatriate footballers
Expatriate footballers in Greece
Portuguese expatriate sportspeople in Greece
Sportspeople from Viseu District